The 752nd Tank Battalion was an American independent tank battalion that participated in the Mediterranean Theater of Operations with the US Fifth Army in World War II.

The 752nd Tank Battalion officially formed on June 1, 1941.

On 21 March 1943, while in Tunisia, the battalion was inactivated by General Orders Number 31, Fifth Army, and was reconstituted as the 2642nd Armored Replacement Battalion. Their role during this time was to train and prepare replacements for various armored units in North Africa. On 16 September 1943, however, the clerical error was discovered, the general order inactivating the battalion was rescinded, and the 752nd was reactivated as a combat battalion. The unit remained in Tabarka and Bizerte until they shipped to Naples on January 12, 1944 to join the Italian Campaign.

First Combat - May 23, 1944 
The unit was part of the US Fifth Army attached to the 88th Infantry Division when it first engaged the enemy.

Attachments 
During its time in the MTO, the 752nd was attached to the following units, either as a whole Battalion or individual companies:

 US II Corps
 US IV Corps
 US 34th Infantry Division
 US 85th Infantry Division
 US 88th Infantry Division
 US 442nd Infantry Regiment

References

United States Army, "752nd Tank Bn" (1945). World War Regimental Histories. Book 60.
http://digicom.bpl.lib.me.us/ww_reg_his/60

After action report, 752d Tank Battalion, 23 May 44 - 28 Aug 44, Oct 44 and Dec 44, Jan thru 3 May 45.

Tank battalions of the United States Army